The Kohima Capital Cultural Center is a cultural center located at Police Reserve Hill, Kohima, Nagaland, India. The center has a multipurpose hall and provides various facilities for citizens. The main hall with a seating capacity of 1800 is the largest in Nagaland.

The center includes exhibition halls, conference hall with 150 seating capacity, restaurant with pantry, dedicated basement parking facility for 40 cars and many other facilities.

History
The project was first sanctioned in 2005 and construction soon began but was halted for more than a decade due to a land dispute issue. Under the supervision of the Kohima Smart City Development Ltd. (KSCDL), construction resumed in 2019 and was completed one month ahead of its schedule in November 2021. The cultural center was opened to public on 1 December 2021.

Location
The Capital Cultural Center is located at PR Hill, above the NSF Martyrs' Park along the National Highway 2 and 29 (also Asian Highway 1 and 2).

References

External links 

Buildings and structures in Kohima
Culture of Nagaland
Kohima
Event venues established in 2021
2021 establishments in Nagaland